Wanfeng Auto Holding Group Co., Ltd., headquartered in Xinchang County, China, is a parts and equipment manufacturer for the automotive industry, aerospace industry, military industry, and energy saving.

It manufactures lightweight metal parts: aluminum wheels and magnesium alloy materials, and provides environmental protection coatings, hybrid vehicle and electric vehicle assembly and powertrain systems, technical services and control systems.

It is involved in aircraft manufacturing and research & development, airport construction and management and general aviation operations: aerial sightseeing, air sports and flight training services.

It supplies industrial automatic gating systems, low pressure and gravity die cast machines and auxiliary equipment, with consulting and maintenance and repair services, and provides automation for auto and heavy industries and industrial robot intelligent equipment.

It provides private equity, hedge fund and finance leasing services.

It designs, develops, and constructs real estate properties and services high-rise buildings, multi-story residences, villas, office buildings, community and commercial buildings and government properties.

It is amongst the Chinese Private Enterprises Top 500 (#123) and China Auto Industry Top 30 (#18).
It is listed on the Shenzhen Stock Exchange and is a part of the SZSE 200 Index.

References  

Companies based in Zhejiang
Companies listed on the Shenzhen Stock Exchange
Metal companies of China
Manufacturing companies of China
Chinese brands